The EF English Proficiency Index (EF EPI) attempts to rank countries by the equity of English language skills amongst those adults who took the EF test. It is the product of EF Education First, an international education company, and draws its conclusions from data collected via English tests available for free over the internet. The index is an online survey first published in 2011 based on test data from 1.7 million test takers. The most recent edition was released in November 2022.

Methodology 
The EF EPI 2022 edition was calculated using test data from 2.1 million test takers in 2021.  The test takers were self-selected.  111 countries and territories appear in this edition of the index.  In order to be included, a country was required to have at least 400 test takers.

Report 
The report is composed of a country ranking table, several pages of analysis with graphs correlating other economic and social factors with English proficiency, and analysis of each region or continent.  The 2022 report includes English proficiency levels by gender, age group, and region, within countries, and some English proficiency scores by city. The website displays portions of the report and has analysis of English skills in many countries and territories.

Primary conclusions 
 Exports per capita, Gross National Income per capita and innovation all correlate positively with English proficiency.  
 English proficiency levels are evolving at different rates in different countries, including a few countries with declining English skills.
 Europe has the highest proficiency in English, while the Middle East averages the lowest.

2022 country rankings 
Below are the latest country scores, proficiency bands, and rankings as published in 2022.

2022 city rankings

Similar reports 
The European Commission performed a language survey, SurveyLang, which tested a representative sample of 15-year-old European students on their foreign language skills.  The report and data sets were released for 13 European countries in June 2012.

See also 
 English as a second or foreign language
 Test of English as a Foreign Language

References

External links

International rankings
English language
English-language education
EF Education First